Mark of the Mole is an album by American art rock group The Residents, released in 1981 on Ralph Records. The first in what was intended to be a "trilogy" (of six albums) with a narrative centred on a conflict between two rival peoples, the Moles and the Chubs.

Concept 
Mark of the Mole introduces the Moles (a subterranean society whose gods offer salvation through hard labor) who are forced to abandon their tunnels due to flooding at the start of the album. The Moles enter the land of the Chubs (a vapid, hedonistic culture which resides under the sea), seeking work and a new home.

Initially, the Moles are welcomed with open arms because the Chubs despise hard labor. Conflict arises when a Chub scientist invents a machine that can do the work instead, making the Moles obsolete and sparking a brief war. The short instrumental track "Resolution?" ends the album without giving a clear conclusion to the narrative; the liner notes to the album The Big Bubble (billed as "Part Four of the Mole Trilogy") states that the war ended with no clear winner, and the two ethnic groups live together in uneasy peace into the next generation.

History 
Mark of the Mole and its follow-up album, The Tunes of Two Cities, became the basis for The Residents' first international touring production, The Mole Show.  Penn Jillette, who appeared as MC of the Mole Show, has an uncredited appearance as a weatherman on "Voices of the Air."

An Atari 2600 game based on the album was being developed by Greg Easter in 1983, but it was later cancelled.

Track listing

1988 CD bonus tracks 
Tracks 7-11 are taken from the 1982 EP Intermission, which collected the intermission music that was played from tape between acts of the Mole Show.

2019 pREServed edition (Mole Box) 
A deluxe box set pertaining to the entire Mole Trilogy concept was released in 2019. It contained newly remastered editions of Mark of the Mole, The Tunes of Two Cities and The Big Bubble, as well as recordings of the Mole Show and a sixth disc of miscellaneous recordings related to the project. Discs One and Six are shown here for their relevance.

References 

The Residents albums
Rock operas
1981 albums
Ralph Records albums